The 2010–11 San Diego State men's basketball team represented San Diego State University in the 2010–11 college basketball season. It was their 12th season in the Mountain West Conference. This was head coach Steve Fisher's twelfth season at San Diego State. The Aztecs competed in the Mountain West Conference and played their home games at Viejas Arena.

The 2010-11 season was arguably the best season in San Diego State's 90-year basketball history.  The Aztecs finished the regular season as Mountain West co-champions with BYU, and won the 2011 Mountain West Conference men's basketball tournament to gain the conference's automatic bid to the 2011 NCAA Division I men's basketball tournament. After defeating Northern Colorado in the second round for their first ever NCAA Tournament win, the defeated Temple in the third round to advance to the Sweet Sixteen where they were defeated by eventual tournament champion Connecticut to finish the season 34–3.

Off-season

Departures

Incoming transfers

2009 recruiting class

Roster

Source

Schedule and results
Source
 All times are Pacific

|-
!colspan=9 style=| Exhibition

|-
!colspan=9 style=| Regular season

|-
!colspan=9 style=| Mountain West tournament

|-
!colspan=10 style=| NCAA tournament

|-

Rankings

*AP does not release post-NCAA Tournament rankings.

Players drafted into the NBA

See also
 2010–11 MWC men's basketball season
 San Diego sports curse

References

External links
 Aztec Basketball Official Site 

San Diego State
San Diego State Aztecs men's basketball seasons
San Diego State
San Diego State Aztecs men's basketball
San Diego State Aztecs men's basketball